Mount Circe is a prominent mountain peak over  high, standing just north of Mount Dido in the Olympus Range of Victoria Land. It was named by the Victoria University of Wellington Antarctic Expedition (1958–59) after Circe, a figure in Greek mythology.

References
 

Mountains of Victoria Land
McMurdo Dry Valleys